Bolshaya Polyana is the name of several rural localities in Russia:
Bolshaya Polyana, Kaliningrad Oblast, a settlement in Znamensky Rural Okrug of Gvardeysky District in Kaliningrad Oblast
Bolshaya Polyana, Lipetsk Oblast (or Bolshaya polyana), a selo in Bolshepolyansky Selsoviet of Terbunsky District in Lipetsk Oblast; 
Bolshaya Polyana, Republic of Mordovia, a selo in Bolshepolyansky Selsoviet of Kadoshkinsky District in the Republic of Mordovia; 
Bolshaya Polyana, Novosibirsk Oblast, a settlement in Kochenyovsky District of Novosibirsk Oblast
Bolshaya Polyana, Rostov Oblast, a settlement in Gashunskoye Rural Settlement of Zimovnikovsky District in Rostov Oblast
Bolshaya Polyana, Republic of Tatarstan, a village in Alkeyevsky District of the Republic of Tatarstan